Ravidassia or the Ravidas Panth is a branch of Sikhism , based on the teachings of Ravidass, who is revered as a satguru.

Historically, Ravidassia represented a range of beliefs in the Indian subcontinent, with some devotees of Ravidass counting themselves as Ravidassia, but first formed in the early 20th-century in colonial British India. The Ravidassia tradition began to take on more cohesion following 1947, and the establishment of successful Ravidassia tradition in the diaspora. Estimates range between two to five million for the total number of Ravidassias.

Ravidassias Sikhs believe that Ravidas is their Guru (God) whereas the Khalsa Sikhs have traditionally considered him one of many bhagats (holy person), a lower position to Guru in Sikhism. Further, Ravidassias Sikhs accept living sants of Ravidass Deras as Guru A new Ravidassia religion was launched following an assassination attack on their visiting living Guru Niranjan Dass and his deputy Ramanand Dass in 2009 in Vienna by Khalsa Sikhs militants. Ramanand Dass died from the attack, Niranjan Dass survived his injuries, while over a dozen attendees at the temple were also injured. This triggered a decisive break of the Ravidassia group from the orthodox Sikh structure.

Prior to their break from Khalsa Sikhism, the Dera Bhallan revered and recited the Guru Granth Sahib of Sikhism in Dera Bhallan. However, following their split from mainstream Sikhism, the Dera Bhallan compiled their own holy book based exclusively on Ravidas's teachings, the Amritbani Guru Ravidass Ji, and these Dera Bhallan Ravidassia temples now use this book in place of the Guru Granth Sahib.

Basis

Ravidas was born on 15 January 1377 CE (Indian calendar Sunday Sukhal Falgin Parvithta 1433) to the Chamar community.
 His birthplace was a locality known as Seer Govardhan in the city of Varanasi, Uttar Pradesh state, India. The birthplace is now marked by the Shri Guru Ravidass Janam Asthan (Begampura), and is a major place of pilgrimage for the followers of Guru Ravidas today. Ravidassias Sikhs believe that Ravidas died in Benares at the age of 151.

Beliefs
Ravidas taught the following principles:
 The oneness, omnipresence and omnipotence of God.
 मन चंगा तो कठौती में गंगा.
 The human soul is a particle of God.
 The rejection of the notion that God cannot be met by lower castes.
 To realize God, which is the goal of human life, man should concentrate on God during all rituals of life.
 The only way of meeting with God (moksha) is to free the mind from duality.

Places of worship

A Ravidassia place of worship is called a dera, sabha, mandir, gurudwara, or bhawan, sometimes translated as temple. It is considered respectful towards Guru Ravidas and generally mandatory to cover one's head and take off one's shoes when entering the place of worship.

Outside the sabha there is always a flag upon which is written the Nishaan, and above it the "Harr" symbol which symbolising enlightenment from Guru Ravidas' teachings. But Guru Ravidass Sabhas Derby, Walsall, Gravesend, Montreal and Papakura are exceptions, as these Sabhas' official title boards display Ek Onkar and Khanda emblems alongside Harr. The title boards of these sabhas clearly mark the buildings as both Sikh Gurdwaras and Ravidass Temples. Moreover, Derby Sabha's display board mentions it as a Sikh temple

Langar takes place inside the sabha continuously as a practice, and all are free to partake of it.

Scriptures
Ravidassia places of worship contain the holy book Amritbani Guru Ravidass Ji which contains all the hymns by Guru Ravidas. This book contains the following hymns: Raga – Siri (1), Gauri (5), Asa (6), Gujari (1), Sorath (7), Dhanasari (3), Jaitsari (1), Suhi (3), Bilaval (2), Gaund (2), Ramkali (1), Maru (2), Kedara (1), Bhairau (1), Basant (1), and Malhar (3). The book contains 140 shabads, 40 pade, and 231 salok. There are 177 pages in all of the book.

A version of the holy book Amrit Bani containing 240 hymns of Guru Ravidas was installed at the Guru Ravidas temple in Jalandhar, Punjab, on 1 February 2012 on the occasion of birth anniversary of Guru Ravidass. The Dera Sach Khand Ballan religious community had announced the formation of the new Ravidassia religion and separation from Sikhism at Varanasi. The split from Sikhism was triggered after the killing of its deputy head Ramanand Dass in May 2009 at a temple in Vienna by some Sikh radicals.

President of newly formed Begumpura Lok Party and a supporter of the new religion, Satish Bharti, said that the copies of the new Bani were put on display during the religious processions in order to assert that the community members are firm believers of the new religion.

Ravidassia in the UK Census

In Britain, during the 2011 Census, the Office for National Statistics counted Ravidassia as a separate religion from Sikhism. There were 11058 individuals who claimed themselves Ravidassia in the census, out of around 100,000 strongholds in the Ravidassia community. Data shows that around 10% of members of  Ravidassias community cited their religion as ’Ravidassia’ – empathically distinct from Sikhs and Hindus. During the census, not even a single Guru Ravidass Gurdwara came into direct support of this separate identity, and till date, all Guru Ravidass Gurdwaras in Britain are practising Sikhism and they do pray and perform all rituals in the presence of Shri Guru Granth Sahib.

Contrary to Britain’s Office for National Statistics, the Indian government and its census department have not accepted the Ravidassias community as a religion. During the 2011 census, the Ravidassia community was counted alongside other synonymous such as Ramdasia Sikh and Jatav under the title of chamar caste.

Customs
The Ravidassia employ the greeting "ਜੈ ਗੁਰੂਦੇਵ" (Jai Gurdev, जय गुरुदेव), meaning “hail the god-like teacher”, the motto of the religion.

Symbols 

The Ravidassia religious symbol is known as the Harr Nishaan ("sign of God"). The Gurmukhi transliteration of the name Harr is the main symbol of the Ravidassia religion. It is also called as Koumi Nishan.

The religion is also represented by a flag, with the insignia "Har" which, states Ronki Ram, includes:
 A bigger circle with 40 rays of sunlight signifying forty hymns of Guru Ravidas;
 Inside the big circle is a small circle, inside which is written "Har" in Gurmukhi language (ਹਰਿ) with a flame on top of it;
 The flame represents the Naam (word) that would illuminate the entire world, and reaches the outer circle;
 Between the two circles is written a couplet composed by Ravidas: ਨਾਮ ਤੇਰੇ ਕਿ ਜੋਤੀ ਲਗਾਈ, ਭੇਈਓ ਓ ਭਵਣ ਸਗਲਈ (Naam tere kee jot lagayi, Bhaio Ujiaaro Bhawan saglaare, "Your Name is the flame I light; it has illuminated the entire world")

The insignia Har, states Ram, represents the "very being of Ravidass and his teachings". It is chosen after the name of their Guru, as ravi means "illumination" and dass "servant of god".

Sikh Ravidassia

Majority of Ravidasias practicing Sikhism and having faith in Shri Guru Granth Sahib.This branch of Ravidasias are mainly residing in Malwa region of Punjab. Most of the Guru Ravidass Gurdwaras are staunch follower of Shri Guru Granth Sahib and first and oldest shrine on Fiji Island constructed by Ravidassia community is also known as Nasinu Sikh Temple. This Gurdwara was constructed by Ravidasias migrants from Doaba in 1939.

Ravidassia/ Ramdasia and Ad-Dharmi Sects of Punjabi Chamar Community
"Ramdasia is a term used in general for Sikhs whose ancestors belonged ex  Chamar caste. Originally they are followers of Guru Ravidass ji who belongs to Chamar community ". Both the words Ramdasia and Ravidasia are also used inter changeably while these also have regional context. In Puadh and Malwa, largely Ramdasia in used while Ravidasia is predominantly used in Doaba.

Ramdasia Sikhs are enlisted as scheduled caste by Department of Social justice, Empowerment and Minorities- Government of Punjab. On Department's list of Scheduled Caste, this caste is listed on serial number 9 along with other Chamar caste synonymous such as Ravidasia, Jatav and so on.

Ad-Dharmis of Chamar sect are followers of Guru Ravidas , and incorporate elements of Sikhism as they regard Shri Guru Granth Sahib as their religious text.

Festival

The birthday of Ravidas is celebrated every year at the Seer Gowardhanpur village temple in Varanasi the state of Uttar Pradesh in January or February and the government of India has declared it a gazetted holiday.

Every year more than 1 million devotees from India and abroad visit the Seer Goverdhanpur temple. In India, devotees pour in from Punjab, Haryana, Gujarat, MP, Bihar, UP and Uttarakhand while foreign devotees from the US, Canada and UK throng the village.

On the day there is a Path of Amritbani Guru Ravidas read, the Harr Nishaan Sahib is changed ceremonially, and there is a special Ravidassia Arti and a Nagar Kirtan procession bearing Shri Guru Ravidas' portrait to the accompaniment of music through the streets of the temple locality.

Special pilgrim trains have been run to and from Varanasi for the last 12 years on the occasion of Parkash Ustav of Guru Ravi Dass. A special train has been run from Jalandhar to Varanasi and back every year on Guru Ravidass Jyanti Purb for the convenience of the pilgrims, since 2000.

Ravidasia Diaspora 

Ravidasia Sikh diaspora emigrated from India and Pakistan is significant. There are Ravidasia Sikh settlers in Europe, as well as a sizable Ravidasia Sikh population in North America, primarily in the United States and Canada. Mahiya Ram Mehmi and Mahey were the very first people who landed in British Columbia in 1906. They were both also involved in the foundation of the first Canadian Gurdwara, the Khalsa Diwan Society , Vancouver. There is a sizeable population of Ravidasia Sikhs in Oceania too. Ravidassias from Doaba established the second gurdwara in the Oceania region in Nasinu on Fiji Island in 1939. A Classical Study by W.H. Briggs in his book Punjabis in New Zealand, Briggs penned down the precise number of Ravidassias in New Zealand during the very first wave of immigration.
Today they have presence in every major city of world where they have also established Guru Ravidass Gurdwaras and Sikh Temples.

Notable Ravidassia

Religious figures

 Guru Ravidas, was an Indian mystic poet-saint of the bhakti movement during the 15th to 16th century CE

 Giani Ditt Singh - Co Founder - Singh Sabha Movement , First professor of Punjabi Language.
Bhai Sangat Singh,  was a Sikh warrior and martyred of Battle of Chamkaur.
 Haralayya, 11th century Lingayat saint.
 Swami Achootanand, was a poet, critic, dramatist, historian, social reformer, former Arya Samajist and founder of the Adi Hindu movement.

Historical figures 
 Avantivarman,  was a king who founded the Utpala dynasty. He ruled Kashmir from 855 to 883 CE and built the Avantiswami Temple.
 Sankaravarman, was a Chamar king of the Utpala dynasty,a Hindu kingdom which ruled over the Kashmir region from 8th to 10th century CE.
 Sugandha,  was the Queen of Kashmir in the northern Indian subcontinent during the 10th century.
 Didda, also known as The Catherine of Kashmir and The Witch Queen, was the ruler of Kashmir from 980 CE to 1003 CE.

Revolutionaries and freedom fighters 
Banke Chamar, Freedom Fighter.
Chetram Jatav, Freedom Fighter.
Captain Mohan Lal Kureel, officer of Chamar Regiment.
Babu Mangu Ram, known popularly as Babu Mangu Ram Chaudhry, was an Indian freedom fighter, a politician from Punjab and one of the founder members of the Ghadar Party.

Politics

India 

Babu Jagjivan Ram - Former Deputy Prime Minister of India.
Kanshi Ram - Founder Bahujan Samaj Party and tallest Dalit Leader after Dr. B.R. Ambedkar
Mayawati, leader of Bahujan Samaj Party and Chief Minister of Uttar Pradesh.
Chandrashekhar Azad, is an Indian lawyer and Dalit rights activist and an Ambedkarite who is the co-founder and national president of the Bhim Army.
Late Chand Ram (politician)- Former Member Parliament and Former Deputy Chief Minister of Haryana 
Selja Kumari- Former Minister of Social Justice and Empowerment and Tourism in the Government of India.
Meira Kumar-  Former Indian Diplomat and Speaker of Lok Sabha (2004 to 2009).
Vijay Sampla- Former Minister of State for Social Justice and Empowerment in the Government of India
Som Parkash Kainth IAS - Former Bureaucrat and Current Union Minister of State for Commerce and Industry, Government of India.
Rattan Lal Kataria- Union Cabinet Minister, Government of India
Chaudhary Sadhu Ram (January 1909 – August 1975) - Five-time Member of Parliament from Phillaur Constituency
Chaudhary Sunder Singh- Member Parliament 1980 - 1989 from Phillaur Constituency
Bhagat Ram - Former Member Parliament Phillaur Constituency
Harbhajan Lakha - Former Member Parliament from Phillaur Lok Sabha constituency
Satnam Singh Kainth - Former Member Parliament from Phillaur Constituency
Sukhdev Singh Libra - Former Member Parliament Lok Sabha from Fatehgarh sahib Constituency
Harchand Singh- Former Member Parliament Lok Sabha
Santokh Singh Chaudhary- Current Member Parliament from Jalandhar Constituency
Amar Singh (Punjab politician)-Former Bureaucrat and Current Member Parliament from Fatehgarh Sahib.
Navneet Kaur Rana- Former Actress and Current Member Parliament from Amravati Lok Sabha constituency
Santosh Chowdhary - Former Member Parliament Lok Sabha
Shamsher Singh Dullo- Former Member Parliament Rajya Sabha and Lok Sabha
Harinder Singh Khalsa - Member Parliament and former I.F.S.
Mohinder Singh Kaypee - Former Member Parliament.
P. L. Punia IAS - Former Bureaucrat and Former Member Parliament both Rajya Sabha and Lok Sabha
Sadhu Singh- Former Member of parliament from Faridkot from 2014 to 2019

Governors
Babu Parmanand - Former Governor of Haryana
Baby Rani Maurya- Former Governor of Uttarakhand and current Cabinet Minister in Uttar Pradesh Government

Punjab State Politics
Charanjit Singh Channi- Former Chief Minister of Punjab.
Lal Chand Kataruchakk - Current Minister for Food, Civil Supplies & Consumer Affairs Forest and Wild Life Preservation, Punjab Government
Harpal Singh Cheema - Current Finance Minister, Punjab Government
Baljit Kaur - Current Minister for Social Justice, Empowerment & Minorities Social Security and Development of Women and Children
Late Gopal Singh Khalsa - Member of Legislative Assembly during British Rule, Secretary SGPC and first Dalit Sikh who did Law graduation from San Joaquin Delta College, Stockton (California) in 1923.
Late Master Gurbanta Singh - Tallest Dalit leader of Punjab, educator and key person of Ad Dharm movement.
Late Chaudhary Jagjit Singh- former MLA of Kartarpur and minister.
Late Jagat Ram Soondh - Former Cabinet Minister, Punjab Government
Chaudhary Surinder Singh- Former M.L.A from Kartarpur Assembly constituency
Avinash Chander - Former 2 times M.L.A 
Pawan Kumar Tinu - Former 2 times M.L.A
Des Raj Dhugga - Former 2 times M.L.A
Joginder Pal - Former M.L.A Bhoa Assembly constituency 
Sarwan Singh Phillaur - Former Minister and 6 times M.L.A
Darshan Singh Kaypee - Former Minister Punjab Government
Baldev Singh Khaira - Former M.L.A
Vaninder Kaur Loomba- Former M.L.A
Jagtar Singh Jagga Hissowal- Former M.L.A
Kulwant Singh (politician) - First Mayor of Mohali City and Current M.L.A.
Jiwan Singh Sangowal - M.L.A Gill Assembly constituency
Saravjit Kaur Manuke - M.L.A Jagraon Assembly constituency
Sheetal Angural - M.L.A Jalandhar West Assembly constituency
Dr.Ravjot Singh- M.L.A Sham Chaurasi Assembly constituency
Dr.Raj Kumar Chabbewal- M.L.A Chabbewal Assembly constituency
Dr.Sukhwinder Kumar - M.L.A Banga Assembly constituency
Dr. Charanjit Singh - M.L.A Chamkaur Sahib Assembly constituency
Rupinder Singh - M.L.A Bassi Pathana Assembly constituency
Manwinder Singh- M.L.A Payal Assembly constituency
Hakam Singh Thekedar - M.L.A Raikot Assembly constituency
Rajneesh Dahiya- M.L.A Firozpur Rural Assembly constituency
Amandeep Singh Musafir - M.L.A Balluana Assembly constituency
Amit Rattan- M.L.A Bathinda Rural Assembly constituency
Principal Budh Ram Singh- M.L.A Budhalada Assembly constituency
Kulwant Singh Pandori- M.L.A Mehal Kalan Assembly constituency
Gurdev Singh Mann - M.L.A Nabha Assembly constituency

Other States Politics
Chandrashekhar Azad, is an Indian lawyer and Dalit rights activist and an Ambedkarite who is the co-founder and national president of the Bhim Army.
Geeta Bhukkal - Former Minister, Haryana and Current M.L.A since 2005

Athletes, Art and Culture 
Ginni Mahi, is an Indian Punjabi folk, rap and hip-hop singer hailing from Jalandhar, Punjab, India.

Miss Pooja - Punjabi Singer

Amar Arshi- Punjabi Singh famous for song kala chashma 

Amar Singh Chamkila - Punjabi Singer

Seth Kishan Dass - was a leather trader, propagator of the Ad-Dharm movement, and a politician.

 Netan Sansara - British Footballer.
 Hima Das - an Athlete

Civil servant 

Swaran Ram Darapuri IPS - Former I.G , Uttar Pradesh
Darbara Singh Guru IAS - Former principal secretary
P. L. Punia IAS - Former Bureaucrat and Former Member Parliament both Rajya Sabha and Lok Sabha
Som Parkash Kainth IAS - Former Bureaucrat and Current Union Minister of State for Commerce and Industry, Government of India.
Amar Singh (Punjab politician) IAS - Former Bureaucrat and Current Member Parliament
Meira Kumar IFS- Former Indian Diplomat and Speaker of Lok Sabha (2004 to 2009)

See also

 Dera Sach Khand
 Sant Mat
 List of Ravidassia people
 Bhakti movement
 Ramdasia Sikhs
 Sects of Sikhism#Split traditions

References

External links

 
Bhakti movement
Bhakti-era Hindu sects
Contemporary Sant Mat
Nirguna worship traditions
Sant Mat
Dalit communities
Social groups of Punjab, India
Weaving communities of South Asia